Kinetic Inhibitors are a new and evolving technology of a class of Low Dosage Hydrate Inhibitors (LDHI) that are polymers and copolymers (or a mix thereof). The most common of which is polyvinylcaprolactam (PVCap). These inhibitors are primarily utilized to retard the formation of clathrate hydrates. This problem becomes most prominent in flow lines when hydrocarbons and water flow through a line. The pressure and cold temperatures that could be exposed to the flow lines provides an environment in which clathrate hydrates can form and plug up the flow line. The inhibitors generally slow the formation of the hydrates enough so the fluid reaches storage without causing blockage.

Structure
There may be variations on the types and structure of the polymer used as the inhibitor. However, in general, while the gas hydrate is forming, the cavity where the hydrocarbon usually resides. Instead, the alkyl group penetrates the cavity followed by the carbonyl group of the amide group hydrogen bonding to the surface of the hydrate, thus preventing the formation of hydrates.

Uses
These inhibitors chemically retard the formation of clathrate hydrates. Dosage of such inhibitors in the fluid is usually .3% to .5% by weight of the fluid, compared to 10% to 50% by weight for thermodynamic inhibitors for prevention of clathrate formation. Due to this and other factors, kinetic inhibitors are more cost effective than thermodynamic inhibitors. However, if the fluid is in a static environment (i.e. packer fluid), kinetic inhibitors will have limited effect as hydrates will still form over sufficient time. At this point the only viable option is thermodynamic inhibitors.

References

Fluid mechanics